André Narbonne is a Canadian writer, whose novel Lucien & Olivia was longlisted for the 2022 Giller Prize.

Originally a marine engineer, Narbonne settled in Halifax, Nova Scotia, in the mid-1980s, and studied English literature at Dalhousie University. He is a former chair of the Halifax chapter of the Canadian Poetry Association, and was the winner of the Writers' Federation of New Brunswick's David Adams Richards Award in 2008 for his short story "The Separatists". He later pursued his Ph.D. at the University of Western Ontario, and is currently a professor of English at the University of Windsor.

His short story collection Twelve Miles to Midnight, was published in 2016, and was shortlisted for the Danuta Gleed Literary Award in 2017. In 2017, he published the poetry collection You Were Here. Lucien & Olivia, his debut novel, was published by Black Moss Press in 2022.

Works
Twelve Miles to Midnight - 2016
You Were Here - 2017
Lucien & Olivia - 2022

References

21st-century Canadian novelists
21st-century Canadian poets
21st-century Canadian short story writers
21st-century Canadian male writers
Canadian male novelists
Canadian male poets
Canadian male short story writers
Dalhousie University alumni
University of Western Ontario alumni
Academic staff of University of Windsor
Living people
Year of birth missing (living people)